Hatim Kamal Hassanin (born 9 May 1997), is a Qatari professional footballer who plays as a defender  .

Career statistics

Club

Notes

References

1997 births
Living people
Qatari footballers
Association football defenders
Al Sadd SC players
Al-Shahania SC players
Qatar Stars League players